The Church of Mary was an ancient Christian cathedral dedicated to the Theotokos ("Birth-Giver of God", i.e., the Virgin Mary), located in Ephesus (near present-day Selçuk in Turkey). It is also known as the Church of the Councils because two councils of importance to the history of Early Christianity are assumed to have been held within. The church is located in the south stoa of the Olympieion (Temple of Hadrian Olympios) next to the harbor of Ephesus.

History

The church is dated to the early 5th century, coinciding with the Council of Ephesus, the third Ecumenical council in 431, suggesting that it may have been built specifically for that Third Ecumenical Council, during which the title of Theotokos for the Mother of God was declared orthodox. The latest archaeological evidence suggests that the church was built on the ruins of an earlier Roman basilica-like building abandoned around the 3rd century, known as the "Hall of the Muses". Around 500, the church was expanded into a monumental cathedral, whose apse and pillars partially still stand today on the site.

The church served as a cathedral and was the seat of the Bishop of Ephesus throughout Late Antiquity.

An inscription in the Church of Mary indicates there was an even more ancient Synagogue in Ephesus.

See also
Metropolis of Ephesus
Seven churches of Asia
House of the Virgin Mary, also in Ephesus, believed to be the place where Virgin Mary lived until the Dormition
Roman Catholic Marian churches
History of Roman and Byzantine domes

References

Resources
Stefan Karweise, The Church of Mary and the Temple of Hadrian Olympios. Helmut Koester, ed., Ephesos: Metropolis of Asia (Harvard University Press, 1995), 311–20.

External links
Detailed description of the Church of Mary in Ephesus with many photographs

Ephesus
Shrines to the Virgin Mary
Ruined churches in Turkey
5th-century churches
Byzantine church buildings in Turkey